Pink is a ghost town in Tunica County, Mississippi, United States, on the south bank of the White Oak Bayou.

Pink was founded in 1900 by Pink Bizzell, who operated the Pink Post Office from his small store.  By 1907, the post office was closed.

The Phillips Church and Cemetery is all that remains of the hamlet.

References

Former populated places in Tunica County, Mississippi
Ghost towns in Mississippi